The Lovecraft Investigations is a mystery thriller/horror fiction podcast written and directed by Julian Simpson, based on several works of H.P. Lovecraft. Produced by Sweet Talk Productions for BBC Radio 4, the podcast premiered on 2 January 2019, and ended on 29 November 2020 with the conclusion of its third season.

The story is a modernization of the original Lovecraft works, set around the same time the podcast aired and presented as a podcast-within-a-podcast in which the two hosts of the Mystery Machine, a true crime podcast investigating cases related to the occult and conspiracy theories, stumble upon a case hiding a much larger mystery. It features a large voice cast led by Barnaby Kay and Jana Carpenter as the two podcasters, Matt Heawood and Kennedy Fisher.

Each season of The Lovecraft Investigations is titled after, and mostly based on, one of Lovecraft's works, namely 1927's The Case of Charles Dexter Ward, 1930's The Whisperer in Darkness, and 1931's The Shadow over Innsmouth, while creating an overarching story; it is also set within Simpson's Pleasant Green Universe of audio dramas.

Synopsis 
The first season, "The Case of Charles Dexter Ward", follows Heawood and Fisher as they investigate the unexplained disappearance of Charles Dexter Ward, a young patient in a mental health facility in Rhode Island who vanished one day from a closed room, never to be seen again.

In The Whisperer in Darkness, the duo investigates Henry Akeley, an elderly man from Suffolk and former acquaintance of Eleanor Peck, a woman who helped them in the case of Charles Dexter Ward. Although Akeley contacted Peck claiming to have important things to share, upon arriving to his house, he is nowhere to be seen, and the clues and recordings he left behind are puzzling.

In The Shadow over Innsmouth, the two investigate the family of Fisher, after their previous investigations lead them to believe the family might be connected to the conspiracies uncovered in the podcast. To do so, Heawood goes to Iraq, while Fisher goes to Innsmouth.

Production details

The series was written by Julian Simpson and is connected to his Pleasant Green Universe audio drama setting. In particular, a version of The Department, a shadowy government agency monitoring supernatural threats, appears in both the Mythos trilogy of audio dramas and The Lovecraft Investigations; a bonus episode for the final episode of the series also directly mentions Marie Lairre, a character from Mythos. Karen Rose produced all three series with sound design by David Thomas and music by Tim Elsenburg. The "Mystery Machine" characters continue in BBC Radio 4's 2022 Limelight series Who Is Aldrich Kemp?, which continues the Pleasant Green storylines without a Lovecraft connection. In developing the series, Simpson sought to modernize Lovecraft's stories while also tying in different folklore and actual unsolved mysteries.

Voice cast
 Main
Barnaby Kay as Matthew "Matt" Heawood, the co-host of the Mystery Machine who specializes in research, and in the post-production of the podcast
Jana Carpenter as Kennedy Fisher, Headwood's long-time Mystery Machine co-host who specializes in on-site investigating

 Recurring
Nicola Walker as Eleanor Peck (season 1-3), a teacher who specializes in myths and the occult, and comes to regularly act as an advisor for the podcast.
Samuel Barnett as Charles Dexter Ward (season 1, 3), a patient in a psychiatric facility whose inexplicable disappearance is investigated by Heawood and Fisher.
 Mark Bazeley as:
 Doctor Willett (season 1-3), Ward's former psychiatric who was later eventually also placed in a psychiatric institution after brutally murdering a seemingly random woman.
 Albert Wilmarth (season 2-3)
Susan Jameson as Alice (season 1, 3), a librarian met by Fisher in the first season, who meets her again in season 3 after having become a fan of the show.
 Adam Godley as George Shepley / "Dr. Allan" (season 1), a librarian who becomes close to Fisher and helps her in her investigation
David Calder as Henry Akeley (season 2), a former student of Peck who goes missing, leading Fisher and Heawood to go look for him and look into his life.
Phoebe Fox as Parker (season 2-3), a member of a mysterious organization with ties to the supernatural.
Ferdinand Kingsley as "Slide" (season 2-3), a hacker and friend of Fisher who sometimes assists in her investigations
Rebekah Staton as April Marston (season 2)
Steven Mackintosh as Jasper (season 3), an old friend of Heawood
Kyle Soller as Casey (season 3), a man who runs a hotel in Innsmouth
Karla Crome as Melody Cartwright (season 3), a young woman who becomes the target of an elusive group in season 1, and later meets Heawood
 Walles Hamonde as Zadok Allen (season 3), a historian Fisher meets in Innsmouth, and who appears identical to George Shepley

Series
The trailer for The Case of Charles Dexter Ward was released in November 2018 with the full series being released in January 2019. In November 2019, a teaser was released for The Whisperer in Darkness followed the rest of the series in December. The following November, The Shadow Over Innsmouth was released along with three bonus episodes.

Reception
Critical reception for The Lovecraft Investigations has been positive. The Verge called the first series "like Serial mixed with True Detective", and it received praise from The Spectator for its use of audio effects.

In 2019, The Case of Charles Dexter Ward won silver honors for Best Fiction Podcast at the British Podcast Awards. In 2020, the Lovecraft Investigations trilogy was among the top-ten most-listened-to podcasts/broadcasts on BBC Sounds.

References

External links
 

2019 podcast debuts
2020 podcast endings
British podcasts
BBC Radio 4 programmes
BBC Radio dramas
Works based on The Shadow over Innsmouth
Horror podcasts
Weird fiction
Scripted podcasts